Restless Souls is a 1919 American silent drama film directed by William C. Dowlan and starring Alma Rubens, Kathryn Adams and Jack Conway.

Cast
 Alma Rubens as Marion Gregory
 Kathryn Adams as Judith Wingate
 Jack Conway as Hugh Gregory
 Harvey Clark as Chester Wingate
 J. Barney Sherry as Dr. Robert Calvert
 Eugene Burr as Oliver Sloan

References

Bibliography
 Robert B. Connelly. The Silents: Silent Feature Films, 1910-36, Volume 40, Issue 2. December Press, 1998.

External links
 

1919 films
1919 drama films
1910s English-language films
American silent feature films
Silent American drama films
American black-and-white films
Triangle Film Corporation films
Films directed by William C. Dowlan
1910s American films
English-language drama films